The short-headed broad-nosed bat (Platyrrhinus brachycephalus) is a bat species found in Bolivia, northwestern Brazil, Colombia, Ecuador, French Guiana, Guyana, Peru, Suriname and Venezuela.

References 

Bats of South America
Mammals of Bolivia
Bats of Brazil
Mammals of Colombia
Mammals of Ecuador
Mammals of French Guiana
Mammals of Guyana
Mammals of Peru
Mammals of Suriname
Mammals of Venezuela
Platyrrhinus
Mammals described in 1972